Kim Se-jin is a Korean name consisting of the family name Kim and the given name Se-jin, and may also refer to:

 Kim Se-jin (politician) (1965-1987), South Korean politician
 Kim Se-jin (volleyball) (born 1974), South Korean volleyball player